Ramas may refer to:

 Ramas State, a town and former Makwana Koli princely state in Mahi Kantha, and a village in Gujarat 
 Cristobal Ramas (born 1935), Filipino Olympic basketball player
 Kevin Ramas (born 1967), Filipino basketball player